Great Greeks (Megali Ellines) is a television program, produced and broadcast by the Greek television network Skai TV, based on the BBC's equivalent show 100 Greatest Britons. The show features lists and biographies of influential persons, who came to prominence in their fields throughout the history of Greece, in order to be determined through a voting procedure who is considered the greatest Greek of all time by the audience of Greece.

Format
The whole format of the show is made up of three parts. The first part consisted of a voting procedure, which began on 16 April 2008 and lasted until 7 May 2008, in order to choose the 100 predominant personalities. The second part launched with a couple of two-hour-long episodes, which presented the top 100 and revealed the 10 nominees. A new voting began on 23 February 2009, with the audience assuming to vote for the greatest among the final 10 persons, while a series of ten episodes contains extensive biographies of the 10 nominees.

Each episode features a celebrity supporting a nominee. The third part, the Great Final, took place on 18 May 2009, hosted by Alexis Papahelas. It was a live debate between the ten celebrity supporters of the previous episodes and twenty-five advocates, until the end of the voting and the announcement of the Greatest Greek.

Ten greatest Greeks
The final ranking of the ten greatest Greeks.

Other honourable mentions: Yiannis Kelidis

100 Great Greeks

By vote

Alphabetical

By era
Ancient Greece (27)

Byzantine Era (6)
 Basil II (the Bulgar-Slayer)
 Constantine I
 Constantine XI Palaiologos
 Justinian I
 Plethon, Georgius Gemistos
 Theotokópoulos, Doménicos (El Greco)

Modern Era (67)

By discipline
Leaders (37)

Artists (32)

Intellectuals (22)

Religion (4)
 Christodoulos, Archbishop of Athens
 Cosmas of Aetolia
 Margioris, Nikolaos A.
 Constantine I
Sports (3)
 Galis, Nick
 Dimas, Pyrros
 Zagorakis, Theodoros
Business (1)
 Onassis, Aristotle
Other (1)
 Unknown Soldier

See also
 100 greatest Britons
 Greatest Britons spin-offs
 List of Greeks

External links
 Skai.gr. "Μεγάλοι Έλληνες"
Skai TV official website 
BBC Press release on the original British version of the format
 Kathimerini (English Edition). The 100 greatest Greeks of all time. 16 May 2008.

Greece
Lists of Greek people
Greek television series
2009 Greek television series debuts
2009 Greek television series endings
Television series about Greece
Greek television series based on British television series